The Spanish Royal Physics Society (RSEF) is a non-profit institution for the branch of Physical Sciences resulting from the division in 1980 of the Spanish Royal Society of Physics and Chemistry  (Real Sociedad Española de Física y Química, RSEFQ), founded in 1903, into the Royal Societies of Physics (RSEF) and Chemistry (RSEQ) of today. The RSEF has been officially recognised as an Association of Public Interest. It aims to promote and develop the basic knowledge of physics and its applications, and to encourage scientific research and teaching of physics in all reaches of education. The RSEF operates on a national scale and maintains international relations with other Societies with similar aims, including Iberoamerican Societies. More details and the Statutes of the RSEF can be found on its website, http://rsef.es/

The RSEF is structured into Specialised Groups and Divisions (for different areas of physics), such as the Condensed Matter Division and Local Sections (grouping members in different parts of Spain). It also includes a Foreign Section for members of the RSEF who pursue their activity outside Spain.

The main aims of the RSEF are:

 To transmit, to society and institutions alike, the importance of physics in enhancing citizens’ knowledge, the country's economy and its social progress.
 To promote research, teaching and outreach in physics.
 To be a national reference in everything relating to physics sciences and technologies.
 To be the institutional advisory body for all matters concerning physics to the corresponding authorities.
 To take part in setting up nation-wide scientific committees, and to join Spanish representations at international scientific institutions and commissions.
 To assess and work closely with the business sector on issues relating to physics.
 To contribute to scientific and technological education in society at large through the promotion of activities designed to strengthen the dissemination and outreach of physics, including the National and International Physics Olympiads.
 To enable interactions among individuals, institutions and organisations with an interest in physics and, most especially, among members of the RSEF.

RSEF membership may consist of:
 Members: individuals, without restriction in number or nationality.
 Corporate Members: these may be Institutional Members (for instance, teaching or research institutions) or Business Companies collaborating with the RSEF or supporting its aims.

The RSEF is a member Society of the European Physical Society (EPS), the Federation of Iberoamerican Physics Associations (Federación Iberoamericana de Sociedades de Física, FEIASOFI), and the Confederation of Scientific Societies of Spain (Confederación de Sociedades Científicas de España, COSCE) maintaining cooperation agreements with other national and international societies such as the American Physical Society (APS) or the SPF of Portugal.

Early History 

The founding session of the original Spanish Society of Physics and Chemistry (Sociedad Española de Física y Química, SEFQ) took place on 23 January 1903, at the Dean's offices of the Universidad Central at Calle Ancha de San Bernardo, in Madrid, in the old building where the Society established its first offices. The certificate of incorporation undersigned by José Echegaray reads: ‘...Mr. Carracido stated the aim of the meeting, which was to reach an agreement for the incorporation of the Spanish Society of Physics and Chemistry destined to conducting studies and publishing the results thereof in these disciplines by individuals adhering to this idea’. As Carracido recalled in 1909 at the Royal Academy of Exact, Physical and Natural Sciences (Real Academia de Ciencias, RAC):‘In the year 1903 the SEFQ was founded, shortly after which the publication of our Journal was resumed. The existence of these two, the Society and the Journal, reflects on the honour of Spain’.

The first Governing Board of the SEFQ was established as follows:

Originally, the SEFQ was made up of contemporaries of the Generations of 1868 and 1898, who immediately held a majority in the Society's governing bodies. These were, or were to become, members of the Royal Academy of Sciences (at the time, Echegaray was the President of the RAC) with the exception of Federico de la Fuente and Eugenio Piñerúa, who were members of the Academy of Medicine. They all practised their profession, as university professors for the most part, in Madrid. This criterion was maintained for the Governing Board until 1923, when four members who did not reside in the capital were admitted.

Immediately after its foundation, publication of the Society's journal Anales SEFQ commenced. This was the fundamental and almost exclusive means of communication that members were entitled to, which provided an annual end-of-year report, or ‘Memoria’. These reports, along with the minutes of the monthly meetings, are the best guide to the eventful history of the Society. The ‘Memoria’ submitted by the first Board in 1903, which ceased in its functions on 3-XII-1904, reported that the number of papers published in Anales SEFQ in that year was 57, ‘a number that illustrates this country’s growing interest in this genre of studies’, and that the Society's membership in the first year was 263, with a fee of 15 pesetas per year. These membership fees provided the Society's financial support, complemented by a few sporadic donations and charges for advertisements until, in 1911, the Ministry of Public Instruction granted a yearly assignment of 3,000 pesetas, which by 1935 had increased to 13,252 pesetas from the Public Instruction Ministry and 9,500 pesetas from the Ministry of State. By then, membership had reached 1,400 and the annual membership fee had risen to 25 pesetas.

From the 1920s, thanks to scholarships awarded by the Junta para Ampliación de Estudios, a large number of Spanish physicists and chemists had travelled abroad and renowned scientists had visited Spain, including Urbain, Fourneau, Fabry, Perrin, Fajans, Sabatier, Ostwald, Mme. Curie, Einstein, Scherrer, Weiss, Sommerfeld, and many others. Furthermore, the Society gradually became integrated in other scientific societies such as the Committee of the ‘Solar Union’ (the International Union for Cooperation in Solar Research) or in the young International Union of Pure and Applied Chemistry, and was invited to send delegations to various international conferences and commemorations. Some Society scientists (Cajal, Cabrera, Hauser, Rodríguez Mourelo, Torres Quevedo, Casares, Carracido, Moles, etc.) were invited as conference speakers; their works were translated, and they were honoured at teaching and scientific institutions in Europe and America. For example, the ‘father of Spanish physics’, the Lanzarotean Blas Cabrera (who was President of the SEFQ in 1916),   took part at the Solvay Conferences of 1930 and 1933.  In short, in the spirit of the catchphrases ‘building science and building patriotism’, ‘making ourselves known and valued abroad’, or other similar slogans often repeated at the successive Boards’ monthly meetings, scientists of the Generation of 1898 expressed their deep-rooted belief in the Spanish capacity for regeneration.

When the First World War broke out in 1914, the Society's activity suffered little impact at first, despite foreign journals becoming harder to come by and the increasing difficulties faced to obtain products and apparatus from abroad. Instead, the Society took a greater interest in disseminating scientific information within Spain, strengthening ties with teaching centres, insisting, especially for the duration of the war, on the necessary relationship between science and industry, and seeking the collectivization of societies and other national institutions with scientific interests. 
The repercussions of the war, however, were felt after its conclusion in 1918, although we cannot overlook the hypothesis that such effects may have been a consequence of the isolation in which Spain remained during that period. Thus, the Society endured a period of great difficulties between 1919 and 1921 in which, though the risk of disappearance had not been felt, the Society's customary euphoria was shaken, forcing its successive Governing Boards to introduce certain functional modifications.

Thanks to growing membership numbers, more extensive means of financing, and the rise in official endowment, from 1920 (the year in which Manuel Tomás Gil García became treasurer) to 1923 the turnover grew from 14,471 pesetas to 23,566 pesetas. This obviously eased many concerns and contributed to the beginning of a thriving phase in the Society's history.

The Society's contribution to improving scientific education and research in Spain received a very welcome recognition in the year of its silver anniversary (1928), when the SEFQ was granted a royal charter by King Alfonso XIII, during the chairmanship of the physicist Julio Palacios, thus becoming the RSEFQ. While this distinction gave the Society recognition within Spain, it was only a few years later, in 1934, that international recognition became widespread when the RSEFQ held in Madrid the 9th International Chemistry Congress, the first one to be convened after the war (the 8th Congress had been held in 1912). The conference brought together in the Spanish capital more than 1,500 chemists from many countries. The inauguration was led by Niceto Alcalá Zamora, President of the Republic, and Salvador de Madariaga, Minister of Public Instruction.

As this brief outline of the beginnings of the Royal Spanish Society of Physics and Chemistry will suggest, since its foundation this institution has shown a firm interest in placing Spain within the international scientific panorama.

Following the parenthesis of the tragic Spanish Civil War (1936–1939) and its dire consequences, which included the removal of many professorships and forced exiles of scientists (for instance, Cabrera went to Mexico),  the Society had to follow a path of recovery, especially after the 1960s. The number of Territorial (Local) Sections increased, and the first Specialised Groups were formed. Toward the end of the decade the decision was taken to split the Society into two fully independent Societies, the Spanish Royal Physics Society (RSEF) and the Spanish Royal Chemistry Society (RSEQ), giving continuity to the work of the parent Society whose final Biennial Meeting was held in Burgos from 29 September to 3 October 1980. The first president of the RSEF was Carlos Sanchez del Río y Sierra, a Professor of Nuclear Physics at the Faculty of Physical Sciences of the Universidad Central de Madrid (today's Universidad Complutense de Madrid, UCM). Over the following years, more specialised groups were created which became increasingly active within the RSEF, while the Biennial Meetings remain a fixture to this day; the 2019 XXXVII Biennial Meeting of the RSEF took place in Zaragoza Univ. in July. The first Divisions in the RSEF were created in 2017.

The emblem of the RSEF 

After its 2003 Centenary celebrations, the RSEF set about designing the Society's emblem, an initiative that had been delayed from the time when the RSEFQ was divided in 1980 into two independent sister societies, the RSEF and the RSEQ. 

To this aim, a historical study was conducted, beginning with the Public Instruction Act of 1857 promulgated by the Minister of Development, Claudio Moyano, the Act that set forth a re-organisation of Spanish Universities. The academic colours for the six classical faculties at that time (‘white for Theology, garnet red for Law, golden yellow for Medicine, purple for Pharmacy, sky blue for Philosophy and Arts, and turquoise blue for Exact, Physical and Natural Sciences’) were established in the Regulations for the Universities of the Kingdom approved on 22 May 1859, under Queen Isabel II, when the Moyano Act was developed. The turquoise blue, a darker hue than sky blue, is the predominant colour on the RSEF website. Similarly, a survey was conducted of the emblems preserved in the buildings hosting the Faculties of Sciences throughout their existence, as well as other insignias such as that of the former Asociación Nacional de Físicos de España, ANFE, founded in 1949 and the forerunner of the present-day Colegio Oficial de Físicos (COFIS) established in 1977. Incorporating symbols associated with physics, the final RSEF emblem was presented:

It appeared for the first time on the Minutes of the Junta de Gobierno (the RSEF's full Governing Body) of 21-II-2005 and, since then, on all Minutes, RSEF documents, RSEF activities, Specialised Groups and Local Sections, etc. 
The RSEF emblem comprises the following:

 A pendulum at two extreme positions symbolising the measure of time.
 A graded scale allusive to the measure of space.
 And, going beyond classical physics to incorporate some ‘modern’ aspects, the emblem includes a representation of alpha, beta and gamma radiations in a magnetic field, depicting the deviation of the first two. 
 This arrangement is surrounded by a border of laurel (on the left) and palms (on the right); both appear frequently in heraldry. The laurel symbolises everlasting triumph and the coronation of who should reach it; the palm is the symbol of victory and renown. The RSEF emblem likewise includes the royal crown, a legacy of the RSEFQ.

RSEF Presidents 

RSEFQ presidents during the period 1903 – 1980 may be consulted in the article Presidentes de la RSEFQ. The RSEF has had the following Presidents:

 1980–84: Carlos Sánchez del Río y Sierra
 1984–88: 
 1988–93: Alfredo Tiemblo Ramos
 1993–97: José María Savirón de Cidón
 1997-05: Gerardo Delgado Barrio
 2005–10: 
 2010–13: María del Rosario Heras Celemín
 2013–21: José Adolfo de Azcárraga Feliu
2021-...: Luis Viña Liste

Divisions, Specialised Groups and Local Sections 

Since the 1970s, a diversity of Local Sections and Specialised Groups emerged within the Royal Spanish Society of Physics and Chemistry, later distributed into the RSEF or the RSEQ.  In the year 2017 the RSEF Divisions were set up. For details, see https://rsef.es/

Publications 

The earlier research journal Anales de Física published by the RSEFQ was split into two series between 1981 and 1992: 
Anales de Física / Serie A, Fenómenos e interacciones, (ISSN 0211-6243, CODEN AFAIDU)
 Anales de Física / Serie B, Applicaciones, Métodos e Instrumentos, (ISSN 0211-6251, CODEN AFBIDZ).

Between 1992 and 1998 these two physics series were reunited, and the journal recovered its name Anales de Física (ISSN 1133-0376, CODEN AFISEX). Over this period the submission of papers for publication began to dwindle.

Finally, the RSEF journal was discontinued after the second issue in 1998, when Anales de Física was merged with several other European journals (Acta Physica Hungarica, Czechoslovak Journal of Physics,  Il Nuovo Cimento,  Journal de Physique, Portugaliae Physica and Zeitschrift für Physik) to found The European Physical Journal (EPJ). The RSEF published in the year 2000 a closing issue of Anales.

Today, the Spanish Royal Physics Society publishes the Revista Española de Física, which contains articles of general interest; it also provides information on the life of the Society. The RSEF also publishes a monthly Boletín Informativo, which is distributed by email to the Society's membership.

RSEF Physics Awards 

The RSEF had established a number of awards: 
 The RSEF Medal
 Award in the area Physics, Innovation and Technology
 Two Awards for Junior Researchers, in Theoretical and Experimental Physics
 Two Awards for Physics Teaching (in High School and University)
 Prize to the best articles published in Revista Española de Física and in Revista Iberoamericana de Física.

Since 2006, these awards are granted in collaboration with the Fundación BBVA, with a significant increase in their economic endowment.

The present RSEF-Fundación BBVA awards cover the following categories: 
 The RSEF Medal
 Junior Researcher in Theoretical Physics Award
 Junior Researcher in Experimental Physics Award
 Award to Physics, Innovation and Technology
 Award to Teaching and Dissemination of Physics  (Higher Education)
 Award to Teaching and Dissemination of Physics  (Secondary Education)
 Prize for the best Papers in RSEF publications

See also 

 Appendix: Spanish Royal Physics Society Awards
Real Sociedad Española de Química (RSEQ)
On the centenary of the RSEF, see A. Galindo, Mirando hacia atrás, Revista Española de Física, enero-febrero, 15-19 (2003)..

References

External links 

 Spanish Royal Physics Society official website
 Revista Española de Física

Physics organizations